The Flag Officer, Air and Second-in-Command, Mediterranean Fleet was a senior command appointment of the British Royal Navy from January 1947 to 1958 who also administered the 2nd Aircraft Carrier Squadron from 1947 to 1951. The appointment was a continuation of the Second-in-Command, Mediterranean Station first established in 1861 that underwent a series of name changes due to an expansion of additional duties given to the post holder.

History
The office holder was originally established as Second-in-Command, Mediterranean Station in December 1861 then later Second-in-Command, Mediterranean Fleet. On 18 July 1941 as part of an expansion of duties the post holder was renamed Vice-Admiral Commanding, Light Forces and Second-in-Command Mediterranean Fleet until April 1942. The appointment of the Flag Officer, Air, and Second-in-Command, Mediterranean Fleet was created in January 1947 who was additionally responsible for administering the 2nd Aircraft Carrier Squadron  of the Mediterranean Fleet until February 1951 when it was disbanded. The Flag Officer, Air and Second-in-Command, Mediterranean Fleet, then became responsible for commanding shore based aviation based at Malta until 1958. HMS Ocean, Theasus and Glory continued to serve in the Mediterranean Fleet until October 1954.

Second-in-Command, Mediterranean Fleet
Included:

Note:The office holder was sometimes styled as "Second-in-Command, Mediterranean Station"

Vice-Admiral Commanding, Light Forces and Second-in-Command Mediterranean Fleet
Included:

Flag Officer, Air and Second-in-Command, Mediterranean Fleet
Included:

Composition 2nd Aircraft Carrier Squadron
Included:

: 2nd Aircraft Carrier Squadron; Mediterranean Fleet 1947 to 1951

References

Sources
 Cook, Chris (2012). The Routledge Guide to British Political Archives: Sources since 1945. Cambridge, England: Routledge. .
 Grove, Eric J. (1987). Vanguard to Trident : British naval policy since World War II: Second Aircraft Carrier Squadron visits Mediterranean ports February 1948. Annapolis, Md.: Naval Institute Press. .
 Mackie, Colin. "Royal Navy Senior Appointments from 1865" (PDF). gulabin.com. Gordon Mackie, July-September 2018. 
 Watson, Dr Graham. "Royal Navy Organisation and Ship Deployment 1947-2013". www.naval-history.net. Gordon Smith, 12 July 2015.

A